Darryl D'Souza (born 21 June 1966) is an Indian field hockey player. He represented India at the 1992 Summer Olympics. Darryl D'Souza is also a silver medalist in the Asian Games, Beijing, 1990. In 1990, he was awarded a Shiv Chhatrapati

References

External links
 

Field hockey players from Goa
Living people
Indian Roman Catholics
1966 births
Olympic field hockey players of India
Indian male field hockey players
Field hockey players at the 1990 Asian Games
Asian Games medalists in field hockey
Asian Games silver medalists for India
Medalists at the 1990 Asian Games
Field hockey players at the 1992 Summer Olympics